Chasing Liberty is a 2004 romantic comedy film directed by Andy Cadiff and starring Mandy Moore and Matthew Goode. Written by Derek Guiley and David Schneiderman, the film is about the 18-year-old daughter of the President of the United States whose rebellion against the constant presence of Secret Service agents in her life leads to a European adventure and an unexpected romance. Chasing Liberty was filmed on location in Prague, Venice, Berlin, London, Chelmsford and Washington, D.C.

Plot
Anna Foster is the daughter of POTUS James Foster. After Secret Service agents ruin a first date, Anna demands less supervision. For his upcoming trip to Prague, the president agrees to assign only two agents to watch over Anna, whose Secret Service codename is Liberty.

In Prague, Anna and her friend Gabrielle La Clare attend a concert, where she spots numerous agents in the crowd. Believing her father has broken his promise, she eludes her protectors with Gabrielle's help. Outside the theater, she asks Ben Calder for a ride on his motorbike. Unknown to Anna, Ben is a Secret Service agent, and he informs agents Alan Weiss and Cynthia Morales where she can be found. When the president learns of her behavior, he instructs Ben to guard her without revealing his identity, to give her the illusion of freedom while guaranteeing safety.

Believing she is finally free, Anna jumps into the Vltava River naked, mistaking it for the Danube, and she and Ben climb a rooftop to watch an Offenbach opera being shown in a plaza. The next morning, Anna calls her parents. Initially relieved his daughter is safe, the President's tone changes when he is shown photos of her skinny-dipping. Outraged at her father's tone, Anna decides she will go to the Love Parade in Berlin. She and Ben board a train, where they meet Scotty McGruff, a flighty romantic backpacker who gives them a stack of Six Million Dollar Man stickers, telling them to post them in random places. One day when they are unhappy, they may come across one and it will make them smile. Ben discovers that they have boarded a Venice-bound train going in the opposite direction from Berlin.

In Venice, after checking in with agents Weiss and Morales—who are now growing closer romantically—Ben joins Anna and McGruff and together they explore the city. McGruff disappears with Anna's wallet, she is recognized by tourists and she and Ben flee. With no money, they tell a kind-hearted gondolier, Eugenio, that they recently married against her parents' wishes. During the free gondola ride, Ben kisses Anna to hide her from their pursuers. When he learns the "newlyweds" have no place to stay, Eugenio invites them to his house, where they are welcomed by his mother, Maria. That night, thinking their kiss was heartfelt, Anna offers herself to Ben, but he rejects her advances.

The next day, Eugenio drives them to the Austrian border, as Weiss and Morales show up at Maria's house and are told that Anna and Ben are married, which is then reported to Anna's parents, causing confusion. Upset at Ben's rejection, Anna hitchhikes a ride in a truck, leaving him to chase her through the Austrian countryside. Anna comes to a bridge, where she meets the Jumping Germans, a bungee jumping group. Ben arrives just as she is being strapped into the harness, and insists on jumping with her.

Later that evening at the Jumping Germans' camp, one of the Germans invites Anna to share his tent for the night. She refuses and flirts with Ben, who rejects her advances again. Upset, she declares that she will share the German's tent after all; Ben finally admits his feelings for Anna and they spend the night together. At the Love Parade, as Ben explains his actions on the phone to his fellow agents, Anna discovers his identity. Enraged at the apparent betrayal, she runs off, only to be harassed by a group of men who recognize her. Ben rescues her, and Anna and her family return to the United States.

While preparing for college, Anna tells her mother her heart is "a little bit broken." At college, with Weiss and Morales (who plan to marry) still protecting her, she sees a Six Million Dollar Man sticker, reminding her of her European adventure. During Christmas break Anna's father tells her Ben resigned from the Secret Service and is working as a photographer in London. During an exchange program to Oxford University she visits him at the opera, where they kiss, reconcile, and escape on his motorbike.

Cast

 Mandy Moore as Anna Foster
 Matthew Goode as Secret Service Special Agent Ben Calder
 Stark Sands as Grant Hillman
 Jeremy Piven as Special Agent Alan Weiss
 Annabella Sciorra as Special Agent Cynthia Morales
 Mark Harmon as James Foster
 Caroline Goodall as Michelle Foster
 Tony Jayawardena as White House Guard
 Sam Ellis as Phil
 Terence Maynard as Harper
 Lewis Hancock as Press Secretary
 Garrick Hagon as Secretary of State
 Zac Benoir as Chairman of the Joint Chiefs of Staff
 Jan Goodman as National Security Advisor
 Robert Ashe as Chief of Staff
 Beatrice Rosen as Gabrielle la Claire
 Martin Hancock as Scotty McGruff
 Joseph Long as Eugenio
 Miriam Margolyes as Maria
 Adrian Bouchet as Gus Gus
 The Roots as Themselves

Production

Story
The storyline was directly inspired by Chelsea Clinton, who was photographed trying to blend in with other students at a Stanford basketball game.

The problem that Anna Foster (Moore) faces in the film—excessively protective Secret Service agents who behave intrusively, like unwanted chaperones, whenever protecting the children of United States Government officials—had previously provided story material for the 1980 comedy First Family, which had starred Bob Newhart as the President of the United States.

The story in many ways echoes the 1953 romantic comedy Roman Holiday with Gregory Peck, Audrey Hepburn and Eddie Albert.  Hepburn played a princess who slips away from her handlers to be squired around Rome, also on a motor scooter, by Peck, not realizing that he knows her identity and plans a magazine story.  In both films, the leads are accompanied by a goofy friend, in this case played by Albert.

Filming locations
The exterior scenes of the White House were in fact filmed at Hylands House in Chelmsford, Essex, England, because of its resemblance to the White House. Blueprints of the White House were also used to create a digital replica, which helped make the exterior scenes look authentic. These blueprints caused the director some trouble when traveling to Washington, D.C., as his suitcase also contained source material about the Oval Office, among other things. He did make it to Washington, D.C.
 Washington, D.C., United States
 Prague, Czech Republic
 Venice, Italy
 Berlin, Germany
 London, England
 Hylands House, Chelmsford, Essex, England
 Barrandov Studios, Prague, Czech Republic
 Pinewood Studios, Iver Heath, Buckinghamshire, England

Soundtrack
The music soundtrack by Christian Henson was nominated for the World Soundtrack Award in 2004.

 "American Girl" – written by Tom Petty and performed by Tom Petty and the Heartbreakers
 "Life Will Go On" – written and performed by Chris Isaak
 "If I'm Not in Love" – written by Dawn Thomas and performed by Faith Hill
 "Stop the Rock" – written by Hoxley, Gray, Gray, Noko and performed by Apollo 440
 "Vivi Davvero" – written and performed by Giorgia
 "Stay Away" – written by Robert Schwartzman and performed by Rooney
 "Melody" – written by Joe DuBass Henson, Darren Rose, Wasi and performed by 7th Sun
 "The Seed" – written by Tariq Trotter and Cody ChesnuTT and performed by The Roots
 "Deja Vu" – written by Frantisek Cerny and performed by Frantisek Cerny, Milan Cimfe and Pavel Karlik
 "If You Won't" – written and performed by Jesse Harris
 "Who Needs Shelter" – written by Jason Mraz, Eric Schermerhorn and Chris Keup and performed by Jason Mraz
 "Get Busy" – written by Sean Paul, S. Marsden and performed by Sean Paul
 "You're Free" – written by John Ciafone, Lem Springsteen, Ultra Naté, Paul Masterson and performed by Yomanda
 "Satisfaction" – written by A. Benassi and performed by Benny Benassi presents The Biz
 "Wide Open Space" – written by Paul Draper and performed by Mansun
 "Nessun dorma" – written by Giacomo Puccini and performed by Amici Forever
 "To Be With You" – written by Caroline Lost, Christian Henson and performed by Caroline Lost

Reception

Box office
Chasing Liberty opened on January 9, 2004, worldwide in 2,400 theatres, earning $6,081,483 on its opening weekend. It went on to gross $12,195,626 domestically with an additional $117,697 in international revenue, totaling $12,313,323 in worldwide gross earnings, failing to bring back its $23 million budget.

Critical response
The film received mostly negative reviews from critics. Chasing Liberty scored an 18% rating on Rotten Tomatoes based on 117 reviews, with a consensus that it was "Formulaic comfort food for the teen crowd." Michael O'Sullivan of The Washington Post wrote, "Chasing Liberty will probably win over as many fuddy-duddy fathers as fillies with its mixture of sweetness tempered with genial cynicism."

Roger Ebert gave the film a two out of four star rating and found it "surprisingly good in areas where it doesn't need to be good at all, and pretty awful in areas where it has to succeed." Ebert did appreciate Moore's performance, writing, "Moore is just plain likeable, a slurpee blended from scoops of Mary Tyler Moore, Sally Field and Doris Day."

In his ReelViews review, James Berardinelli called Chasing Liberty "a fairly standard-issue teen romantic comedy."

In his review in the San Francisco Chronicle, Mick LaSalle wrote, "Chasing Liberty is a kind of remake of It Happened One Night (1934), updated and retooled for a young audience that won't recognize the connection." LaSalle applauds the film's ability to evoke a young girl's experience of being on her own for the first time, writing, "Anna and Ben romp through Prague and, later, Venice, having adventures and misadventures and meeting various colorful characters, and it's all quite engaging. We understand what this freedom means to Anna, partly thanks to Moore's expressive intelligence, but also through director Andy Cadiff's technique. We see a rock concert, a late-night outdoor screening of an operatic film and the splendors of historic cities through the eyes of a young girl experiencing them for the first time."

Accolades
 2004 Teen Choice Award Nomination for Choice Breakout Movie Star – Male (Matthew Goode)
 2004 Teen Choice Award Nomination for Choice Movie – Date Movie
 2004 Teen Choice Award Nomination for Choice Movie Actress – Drama/Action Adventure (Mandy Moore)
 2004 Teen Choice Award Nomination for Choice Movie Liar (Matthew Goode)
 2004 World Soundtrack Award Nomination for Discovery of the Year (Christian Henson)

References

External links
 
 
 
 
 
 Chasing Liberty at The Numbers

2004 films
2000s comedy road movies
2000s coming-of-age comedy films
2004 romantic comedy films
2000s teen comedy films
2000s teen romance films
Alcon Entertainment films
American comedy road movies
American coming-of-age comedy films
American romantic comedy films
American teen comedy films
American teen romance films
British coming-of-age comedy films
British comedy road movies
British romantic comedy films
British teen comedy films
British teen romance films
Coming-of-age romance films
Films about fictional presidents of the United States
Films about the United States Secret Service
Films about vacationing
Films produced by David Parfitt
Films set in Austria
Films set in Berlin
Films set in London
Films set in Prague
Films set in Venice
Films set in the White House
Films shot at Barrandov Studios
Films shot at Pinewood Studios
Films shot in Berlin
Films shot in Essex
Films shot in London
Films shot in Venice
Films shot in Washington, D.C.
Films directed by Andy Cadiff
2000s English-language films
2000s American films
2000s British films